Saints & Sinners was a short-lived Canadian glam metal band from Montreal, Quebec.

Biography
The band was formed in 1991 by Sword vocalist Rick Hughes. The other five members were Guitarist Stephane Dufour, Bassist Martin Bolduc, Drummers Jeff Salem, Angelo Curico and Keyboards Jesse Bradman (formerly of Night Ranger, Aldo Nova, and UFO). The band released one album, Saints & Sinners in 1992 produced by Aldo Nova. The band disbanded one year later in 1993.

Band members
Rick Hughes – vocals
Jeff Salem – drums
Angelo "Ange" Curcio – drums
Stephane Dufour – guitar, backing vocals
Martin "Marty" Bolduc – bass, backing vocals
Jesse Bradman – keyboards, backing vocals

Discography

Studio albums
Saints & Sinners (1992)

External links
Sleaze Roxx: Saints & Sinners

1991 establishments in Quebec
Canadian glam metal musical groups
Musical groups established in 1991
Musical groups disestablished in 1993
Musical groups from Montreal